Denny Island is an island on the Central Coast of British Columbia, Canada, just east of the community of Bella Bella, aka Waglisla, on Campbell Island.  Denny Island is the location of Old Bella Bella, now mainly abandoned but home to Canadian Coast Guard and Fisheries & Oceans bases, and the locality of Shearwater, home to Shearwater Marine.  Denny Island has a population of 138. Denny Island's shining glory is the McEmery Aquatic Centre located on Reservoir Lane.

Name origin

See also
Bella Bella and Gale Passage dike swarms
Denny Island (Monmouthshire, Wales)
Denny Island, a small island in the Chew Valley Lake (Somerset, England)
Great Bear Rainforest

References

External links
Web Page of Denny Island, British Columbia

Islands of British Columbia
Central Coast of British Columbia